The Houston Public Library is a public library in Houston, Minnesota. It is a member of Southeastern Libraries Cooperating, the SE Minnesota library region.

References

External links
GoogleMap to Library
Online Catalog

Public libraries in Minnesota
Education in Houston County, Minnesota
Buildings and structures in Houston County, Minnesota